A Thousand Junkies is a 2017 American comedy-drama film directed by and starring Tommy Swerdlow.  It is Swerdlow's directorial debut.

Plot
One sunny day in Los Angeles, three heroin junkies, Tommy, T.J. and Blake, try to find some heroin so they can get high. Over the course of the day, with impending and growing withdrawal setting in, each character’s backstory is explored to a degree as they embark on a seedy Odyssey and increasingly desperate measures to stave off dope sickness.

Cast
Tommy Swerdlow as Tommy
T.J. Bowen as T.J.
Blake Heron as Blake
Bill Pullman as himself
Steven Weber as Moshe
Dinarte de Freitas as Igor
David Darmstetter as Liquor Store Owner
Dennice Cisneros as T.J.'s Girlfriend
Jerry Stahl as Cab Driver
Karen Swerdlow as Karen
Lucinda Jenney as Blake's Mom
Patricia Castelo Branco as Ludmila

References

External links
 
 

American comedy-drama films
2017 directorial debut films
2017 comedy-drama films
Films with screenplays by Tommy Swerdlow
Films set in Los Angeles
Films about heroin addiction
Films directed by Tommy Swerdlow
Films produced by Tommy Swerdlow
2010s English-language films
2010s American films